Mirabad (also Romanized as Mīrābād; also known as Nurābād) is a village in Sardshir Rural District, in the Central District of Buin va Miandasht County, Isfahan Province, Iran. At the 2006 census, its population was 659, in 156 families.

References 

Populated places in Buin va Miandasht County